The 2020 Terra Firma Dyip season was the sixth season of the franchise in the Philippine Basketball Association (PBA).

Highlights
June 4, 2020: The PBA Board of Governors approved the transfer of ownership of the Columbian Dyip franchise from Columbian Autocar Corporation to its sister company, Terra Firma Realty Development Corporation. The team will carry the Terra Firma brand.

Draft

Special draft

Regular draft

Roster

<noinclude>

Philippine Cup

Eliminations

Standings

Game log

|-bgcolor=ffcccc
| 1
| October 13
| TNT
| L 101–112
| CJ Perez (30)
| Roosevelt Adams (10)
| McCarthy, Calvo (5)
| AUF Sports Arena & Cultural Center
| 0–1
|-bgcolor=ffcccc
| 2
| October 16
| Rain or Shine
| L 82–91
| CJ Perez (26)
| CJ Perez (10)
| CJ Perez (6)
| AUF Sports Arena & Cultural Center
| 0–2
|-bgcolor=ffcccc
| 3
| October 19
| San Miguel
| L 98–105
| CJ Perez (20)
| CJ Perez (9)
| CJ Perez (6)
| AUF Sports Arena & Cultural Center
| 0–3
|-bgcolor=ffcccc
| 4
| October 24
| NorthPort
| L 96–107
| CJ Perez (25)
| Roosevelt Adams (8)
| CJ Perez (5)
| AUF Sports Arena & Cultural Center
| 0–4
|-bgcolor=ffcccc
| 5
| October 27
| Alaska
| L 96–99
| CJ Perez (25)
| Roosevelt Adams (10)
| CJ Perez (6)
| AUF Sports Arena & Cultural Center
| 0–5

|-bgcolor=ffcccc
| 6
| November 3
| Phoenix
| L 94–116
| CJ Perez (32)
| CJ Perez (9)
| CJ Perez (5)
| AUF Sports Arena & Cultural Center
| 0–6
|-bgcolor=ffcccc
| 7
| November 5
| Magnolia
| L 89–103
| CJ Perez (19)
| Reden Celda (9)
| Tiongson, Khobuntin (3)
| AUF Sports Arena & Cultural Center
| 0–7
|-bgcolor=ccffcc
| 8
| November 6
| Blackwater
| W 110–101
| CJ Perez (27)
| Roosevelt Adams (16)
| Ramos, Calvo, Perez (3)
| AUF Sports Arena & Cultural Center
| 1–7
|-bgcolor=ffcccc
| 9
| November 8
| Meralco
| L 93–95
| Tiongson, Perez (21)
| CJ Perez (8)
| CJ Perez (7)
| AUF Sports Arena & Cultural Center
| 1–8
|-bgcolor=ffcccc
| 10
| November 9
| Ginebra
| L 80–102 
| Tiongson, Perez (16)
| Tiongson, Perez, Faundo (5)
| CJ Perez (5)
| AUF Sports Arena & Cultural Center
| 1–9
|-bgcolor=ffcccc
| 11
| November 11
| NLEX
| L 101–127 
| CJ Perez (27)
| CJ Perez (10)
| Tiongson, Camson (4)
| AUF Sports Arena & Cultural Center
| 1–10

Transactions

Trades

Free agents

Additions

Subtractions

Rookie signings

References

Terrafirma Dyip seasons
Terrafirma Dyip Season, 2020